The  was a submachine gun of Japanese origin, manufactured by Tokyo Arsenal. The Imperial Japanese Army developed the Model 1927, which was fed from a drum magazine. It was ordered from Tokyo Arsenal and tested by the army. However, it was inferior to submachine guns such as the MP 18, and broke during the test. In 1930, a second trial was conducted, and the gun was again by rejected by the army. Model 1 was made in 1936 and Model 2 was made in 1937. Model 2 was at first 6.5 mm caliber, but was later revised to 8 mm.

References

8×22mm Nambu submachine guns
Trial and research firearms of Japan
Submachine guns of Japan
World War II submachine guns